The Ghost in the Swamp is a 2006 film directed by Branko Ištvančić, based on the book Duh u močvari by Anto Gardaš. The film premiered at the 2006 Međunarodni Dječji Festival in Šibenik.

Plot

After Liptus arrives in a small village from the city, he calls his best friends, Miron and Melita, on winter holidays in Kopačevo. That same night, while they are all sleeping cozily, from their deep sleep Miron and Melita are woken by the disturbing sounds of villagers, carrying flares and disappearing into the darkness at the end of the street. At the docks, they find Halasz, a boy known for his bravery. He is cold, pale from shock, and babbling a white ghost. While most of the villagers don't believe Halasz's story, older citizens recall a long time ago when a forgotten spirit would scare people at night in dark and foggy swamps. Everyone locks themselves in their houses and Halasz ends up in a hospital where the doctors can't help him. Miron, Liptus, and Melita, now alone, take matters into their own hands, revealing the secret of the ghost and saving their friend.

Cast

 Ivo Gregurević as Vučević
 Dejan Aćimović as Levay
 Marko Pavlov as Miron
 Ena Ikica as Melita
 Robert Váss as Liptus
 Vlatko Dulić as Farkaš
 Mladen Vulić as Kovačević

Music

The film's soundtrack was composed by Dalibor Grubačević.  It was distributed under Croatia Records 10 October 2006.

References

External links
 Službene stranice redatelja Branka Ištvančića
 

2006 films
2006 action films
Films based on Croatian novels
Croatian children's films
2006 directorial debut films
2000s Croatian-language films